Eric Cortez Wright (born April 18, 1959) is a former American professional football player who was selected by the San Francisco 49ers in the 2nd round of the 1981 NFL Draft. Before that, the  6'1", 183 lbs. cornerback from the University of Missouri was an all-Big Eight defensive back in 1979 and '80. He played on three University of Missouri teams that appeared in bowl games, and was selected for Missouri's all-century team in 1990. Wright shares the Missouri record for the most pass interceptions in a game (three vs. San Diego State in 1979).

Considered one of the best cover cornerbacks of his day, Wright played in ten NFL seasons, from 1981–1990, all for the 49ers including starting on four Super Bowl-winning teams. Wright made a key defensive play in the NFC Championship game on January 10, 1982 against the Dallas Cowboys. On the Cowboys' last possession in the final minute, after Dwight Clark had made The Catch, Wright made a touchdown-saving horse-collar tackle on Cowboy wide receiver Drew Pearson to preserve the 49er win and propel them into their first Super Bowl.

A two-time Pro Bowler, Wright's peak performance year was during the 1983 season when he intercepted 7 passes for 164 yards and 2 touchdowns. He intercepted passes in Super Bowl XVI and Super Bowl XIX.

Wright missed a majority of the 1986 and 1987 seasons with a deep groin pull and chipped bone in the area, missing all but 4 games during the two-year stretch. But he returned as a starter in 1988 and was on the 49ers-back-to-back Super Bowl-winning teams.

Wright is a member of Alpha Phi Alpha fraternity.  He is currently an alumni coordinator for the 49ers.

References

External links
 Profile at NFL.com

1959 births
Living people
African-American players of American football
American football cornerbacks
Missouri Tigers football players
National Conference Pro Bowl players
Players of American football from Illinois
San Francisco 49ers players
Sportspeople from East St. Louis, Illinois
21st-century African-American people
20th-century African-American sportspeople
Ed Block Courage Award recipients